The Civil Society Movement (CSM) is a Lebanese political party and movement founded by Grégoire Haddad in 1998.

Definition and vision
The CSM hopes to build free, democratic and secular citizens through the basic principles of secularism, democracy, participation, sovereignty, justice, development, transparency and Arabism, and aims for a fair country built by free citizens that is open to its surroundings and the world. It is based on the principle that a human being has an absolute value.

References
 secularist.org
 gregoirehaddad.com

Political parties in Lebanon
Secularism in Lebanon